Kevin Ray Mendoza Hansen (born 29 September 1994) is a Filipino-Danish professional footballer who plays as a goalkeeper for Malaysia Super League club Kuala Lumpur City and the Philippines national team.

Club career

Youth
Mendoza is a former FC Midtjylland and Viborg FF youth team player.

Viborg FF
In 2011, he was promoted to Viborg FF's first team squad signing a 3-year contract with the club. Prior to that, he had repeatedly served as backup keeper for the club's first team after the departure of Kristian Kirk.

On 10 June 2012, Mendoza made his debut for Viborg FF on the final match of the season in a 2–1 defeat against FC West Zealand.

In February 2013, Mendoza was given a one-week trial and a chance to train with Liverpool's reserve team.

On April 3, 2014, Viborg FF announced that they had agreed to terminate the contract of Mendoza with immediate effect. Mendoza requested to leave after being demoted as third choice goalkeeper of the club.

Kjellerup IF
A few days after the termination of his contract at Viborg FF, Mendoza joined Kjellerup IF.

On 12 April 2014, Mendoza made his debut for Kjellerup IF in a 3–0 home win against Aabyhøj IF.

Ringkøbing IF
After his stint in Kjellerup IF, Mendoza joined Ringkøbing IF signing a six-month deal.

Thisted FC
On 27 May 2015, Mendoza joined Thisted FC. The club has been following him since the termination of his contract at Viborg FF.

AC Horsens
On 30 June 2018, it was announced that Mendoza have signed a two-year deal with Danish Superliga club AC Horsens. On 22 July, he made his debut for Horsens in a 1–1 home draw against Randers FC. The club announced on 19 June 2019, that they had terminated the contract with the player.

HB Køge
Mendoza joined HB Køge on 2 July 2019.

Vendsyssel FF
On 7 September 2020, he moved to Danish 1st Division club Vendsyssel FF. His contract was terminated on 11 February 2021.

Kuala Lumpur
One day after leaving Vendsyssel, Mendoza joined Malaysian club Kuala Lumpur. He went on to help Kuala Lumpur win the 2021 Malaysia Cup. He was named man of the match in the final against JDT.

International career
Mendoza was born and raised in Denmark of mixed Danish and Filipino heritage which made him eligible to play for Denmark or the Philippines at international level.

In December 2018, Mendoza applied for a Philippine passport to join the training camp of the Philippines national team in preparation  for the 2019 AFC Asian Cup. He was named in the Asian Cup squad but did not feature in the tournament. His international debut was on 15 June 2021 as a half-time substitute for Bernd Schipmann in a World Cup qualifier against the Maldives; he maintained the 1–1 draw of the first half.

Career statistics

Club

International

Honours
KL City FC
 Malaysia Cup: 2021
 AFC Cup runner-up: 2022

References

External links

Danish men's footballers
Danish expatriate men's footballers
Danish Superliga players
1994 births
Living people
Danish 1st Division players
Malaysia Super League players
Vejle Boldklub players
Viborg FF players
Kjellerup IF players
Ringkøbing IF players
Thisted FC players
AC Horsens players
HB Køge players
Vendsyssel FF players
Kuala Lumpur City F.C. players
Association football goalkeepers
2019 AFC Asian Cup players
Danish people of Filipino descent
Citizens of the Philippines through descent
People from Herning Municipality
Danish expatriates in Malaysia
Expatriate footballers in Malaysia
Filipino footballers
Philippines international footballers
Sportspeople from the Central Denmark Region